Route 570 is a  long north–south secondary highway in the western portion of New Brunswick, Canada.

The route starts at Route 107 in Gordonsville. The road travels south through a mostly forested area through South Gordonsville and Mt. Pleasant. It then briefly turns east and crosses the Cold Stream just before entering Jericho. The road then turns south again in Bannon before ending at Route 104 on the Becaguimec Stream east of Bubartown near Coldstream.

See also

References

570
570